The 23rd Golden Eagle Awards were held October 27, 2006, in Changsha, Hunan province.  Nominees and winners are listed below, winners are in bold.

Television series

Best Television Series
Ren Changxia/任长霞Eighth Route Army/八路军
The Qiao Family Grand Courtyard/乔家大院
Showing Sword/亮剑
Witness of Memories/记忆的证明
Lu Liang Heroes/吕梁英雄传
Jiangtang Prison Camp/江塘集中营
Home with Kids/家有儿女
Sha chang dian bing/沙场点兵
Papa, Can You Hear Me Sing?/搭错车
Beautiful Field/美丽的田野
Sky of History/历史的天空

Best Mini-seriesChenyun in Linjiang/陈云在临江Stone Lock Channel/走进石锁沟Aurora Borealis/北极光
True Love/真情
Tiny Me/小小的我
Xibaipo/西柏坡

Best Directing for a Television SeriesYang Yang for Witness of Memories

Best Writing for a Television Series
Ge Fei for Ren Changxia

Best Actor in a Television Series
Li Youbin for Showing Sword
Zhang Guoli for Flos Sophorae
Li Xuejian for Papa, Can You Hear Me Sing?
Wu Jinan for Keep the Red Flag Flying

Best Actress in a Television Series
Liu Jia for Ren Changxia
Jiang Qinqin for Flos Sophorae
Zhu Yuanyuan for Nine Phoenixes
Yin Tao for Papa, Can You Hear Me Sing?

Best Art Direction for a Television Series
Art direction group for Genghis Khan

Best Cinematography for a Television Series
Cheng Shengsheng for Beautiful Field

Best Lighting for a Television Series
Yao Zhuoxi for Nine Phoenixes

Best Sound Recording for a Television Series
Sound recording group for Sha Chang Dian Ping

Favorite Actor
Zhang Guoli for Flos Sophorae

Favorite Actress
Jiang Qinqin for The Qiao Family Grand Courtyard

Literature and art programs

Best Literature and Art Program
2005 CCTV New Year's Gala/中央电视台春节联欢晚会100 Anniversary - Deng Xiaoping/纪念邓小平诞辰100周年
Midmoon Special Program/半个世纪的团聚――中秋特别节目
84 Anniversary of CCP Celebration, In Guangdong/南粤先锋颂――广东省庆祝中国共产党成立八十四周年大型文艺晚會
2006 Hunan TV Spring Festival Gala/和和美美过新年――湖南卫视2006年春节联欢晚会
For Justice and Peace/为了正义与和平

Best Directing for a Literature and Art ProgramDirecting group for 2005 CCTV New Year's Gala

Best Cinematography for a Literature and Art Program
Cinematography group for 2005 CCTV New Year's Gala

Best Art Direction for a Literature and Art Program
Art Direction group for 60 Anniversary of Taiwan Retrocession Commemoration (Our Chinese Heart)/中华情――纪念台湾光复六十周年大型文艺晚会

Documentary

Best Television Documentary
The Forbidden City/故宫'No. 236 Pere David's Deer/236号麋鹿.孤独者的故事Singer Cong Fei/大爱无疆·歌者丛飞
New Tibet/新西藏
Mei Lanfang/梅兰芳

Best Short DocumentaryBacking Soul/归来，殉难亡灵Construction Site/工地
Rosy Cloudy/霞映长空

Best Writing and Directing for a Television DocumentaryWriting & directing group for The Forbidden City

Best Cinematography for a Television Documentary
Cinematography group for The Forbidden City

Children and teens programs

Best Animation
Winter Of Three Hairs /三毛流浪记
Pig King /天上掉下个猪八戒
Big Ear Tutu /大耳朵图图

References

External links

2006
2006 in Chinese television
Events in Changsha
Mass media in Changsha